Prasad or Prasada is a material substance of vegetarian food that is a religious offering in both Hinduism and Sikhism. 

Prasad or Prasada may also refer to:

Arts and entertainment
 Prasad (2012 film), an Indian Kannada-language drama
 Prasad (2018 film), a Nepali language social drama romance

People
 Prasad (name), including list of people with this name
 Prasada Rao (disambiguation)

Other uses
 Prasad Art Pictures, an Indian film production house
 Prasad Studios, an Indian motion picture post production studios
 L. V. Prasad Eye Institute, in Hyderabad, India

See also
 
 
 Prasat (disambiguation)
 Persaud, a surname
 Prasaadam, a 1976 Indian Malayalam film